Angelo Tasca (Moretta, 19 November 1892 – Paris, 3 March 1960) was an Italian politician, writer and historian. 

He was a founding member of the Communist Party of Italy but was expelled in 1929 for his opposition to Stalinism. Having experienced persecution by the fascist regime in Italy, he took refuge in France in 1926 and gained citizenship in 1936. After joining the French Section of the Workers' International in 1934, he worked as a writer for the newspaper Le Populaire. 

He joined the exiled Italian Socialist Party and supported the POUM during the Spanish Civil War. After the signing of the Molotov-Ribbentrop Pact in August 1939 and the consequent resignation of Pietro Nenni, he became one of three joint leaders of the Italian Socialist Party. After the Fall of France, he aligned himself with the pro-German Vichy Government. He held an official position under Paul Marion in the Ministry of Information. He was arrested in September 1944 after the Liberation of France and was charged with collaborationism but was released only a month later after it emerged that he had secretly worked with a Belgian anti-fascist network since 1941.

After the war, he worked for various newspapers, was a consultant for NATO and maintained an anticommunist position during the Cold War.

His daughter, Catherine Tasca, was the French Minister of Culture from 2000 to 2002 and a senator from 2004 to 2017 for the French Socialist Party.

Works 
 I valori politici e sindacali dei Consigli di fabbrica, Libreria editrice dell'Alleanza coop. Turin 1920.
 I Consigli di fabbrica e la rivoluzione mondiale. Relazione letta all'assemblea della Sezione socialista torinese le sera del 13 aprile 1920, Libreria editrice dell'Alleanza coop. Turin 1921.
 L'unità socialista, Imp. ouvrière, Nancy 1937.
 La Naissance du fascisme, Gallimard, Paris 1938. Italian translation: Nascita e avvento del fascismo, La Nuova Italia, 1950 and 1995 and Casa editrice Giuseppe Laterza & figli, 1965.
 Due anni di alleanza germano-sovietica. Agosto 1939-giugno 1941, La Nuova Italia, Firenze 1951.
 In Francia nella bufera, Guanda, Modena-Parma 1951.
 La Guerre du papillon, 1940-1944, Les Iles d'or, Paris 1954.
 Le Pacte germano-soviétique. L'histoire et le mythe, Éditions Liberté de la Culture, Paris 1954, Italian translation: Il patto germano-sovietico. La storia e la leggenda,edited by M. Millozzi, Edizioni Università di Macerata, Macerata 2009.
 Autopsia dello stalinismo, Edizioni di Comunità, Milano, 1958.

References

External links
 Angelo Tasca, The Russo-German Alliance: August 1939 – June 1941

1892 births
1960 deaths
People from the Province of Cuneo
Italian emigrants to France